The Vrhobreznica Chronicle is a Serbian chronicle of which the oldest manuscript dates to 1650, from the Monastery of the Holy Trinity of Pljevlja. It is preserved in the collection of the Prague National Museum. The original text, as those of Koporin, Peć, Studenica and Cetinje, originated in the second half of the 14th century, and represent the oldest Serbian chronicles, and the core of medieval Serbian historiography.

The 14th-century abounds in translations by unknown persons, which were called "chronicles," actually a number of separate but similar manuscripts, stemming from an original historic source that does not survive but assumed to have been written by the credited author.

See also
Serbian chronicles

References

17th-century history books
17th-century manuscripts
Serbian chronicles
Serbian manuscripts
Pljevlja
Nemanjić dynasty
1650 books
Cyrillic manuscripts